Edgar Henry Schein (March 5, 1928 – January 26, 2023) was a Swiss-born American business theorist and psychologist who was professor at the MIT Sloan School of Management. He founded the discipline of organizational behavior, and made notable contributions in the field of organizational development in many areas, including career development, group process consultation, and organizational culture. He was the son of former University of Chicago professor Marcel Schein.

Model of organizational culture

Schein's model of organizational culture originated in the 1980s. Schein (2004) identifies three distinct levels in organizational cultures:

 artifacts and behaviours
 espoused values
 assumptions

The three levels refer to the degree to which the different cultural phenomena are visible to the observer.

 Artifacts include any tangible, overt or verbally identifiable elements in any organization.  Architecture, furniture, dress code, office jokes, all exemplify organizational artifacts. Artifacts are the visible elements in a culture and they can be recognized by people not part of the culture.
 Espoused values are the organization's stated values and rules of behavior.  It is how the members represent the organization both to themselves and to others.  This is often expressed in official philosophies and public statements of identity.  It can sometimes often be a projection for the future, of what the members hope to become.   Examples of this would be employee professionalism, or a "family first" mantra. Trouble may arise if espoused values by leaders are not in line with the deeper tacit assumptions of the culture.
 Shared basic assumptions are the deeply embedded, taken-for-granted behaviours which are usually unconscious, but constitute the essence of culture. These assumptions are typically so well integrated in the office dynamic that they are hard to recognize from within.

Career anchors 
The career anchor is a part of what one finds as they clarify their self-image surrounding one's (1) needs and motives, (2) talents, and (3) values, the anchor being set of needs, values, and talents that a person is least willing to give up when forced to make a choice. The concept is Schein's attempt to reflect the lifelong search of every human to find themselves.

Schein's original research in the mid-1970s identified five possible career anchor groups: (1) autonomy/independence, (2) security/stability, (3) technical-functional competence, (4) general managerial competence, and (5) entrepreneurial creativity. Follow-up studies in the 1980s identified three additional constructs: (6) service or dedication to a cause, (7) pure challenge, and (8) life style.

A 2008 study distinguishes between entrepreneurship and creativity to form nine possible constructs.

Education
 PhD, social psychology, Harvard University, 1952
 Master's Degree, Psychology, Stanford University, 1949
 PhB, BA, University of Chicago, 1947

Publications 
 Coercive Persuasion: A Socio-psychological Analysis of the "Brainwashing" of American Civilian Prisoners by the Chinese Communists with Inge Schneier and Curtis H. Barker (1961) W. W. Norton & Company; .
 Professional Education: Some New Directions (1972) McGraw-Hill; .
 Career Dynamics: Matching Individual and Organizational Needs (1978) Addison-Wesley; .
 Organizational Psychology, 3rd Edition (1979) Pearson; .
 The Clinical Perspective in Field Work (1987) Sage University Papers Series on Qualitative Research Methods, Vol. 5.; .
 The Art of Managing Human Resources edited by Edgar H. Schein (1987) Oxford University Press; .
 Strategic Pragmatism: The Culture of Singapore's Economic Development Board (1996) MIT Press; .
 Process Consultation Revisited: Building the Helping Relationship (1998) Addison-Wesley Longman; .
 DEC Is Dead, Long Live DEC: The Lasting Legacy of Digital Equipment Corporation with Peter S. DeLisi, Paul J. Kampas, and Michael M. Sonduck (2004) Berrett-Koehler Publishers; .
 Procesadvisering: Over De Ondersteunende Rol Van De Adviseur En De Samenwerking Tussen Adviseur En Client (2005) Academic Service; .
 Helping: How to Offer, Give, and Receive Help (2011) Berrett-Koehler Publishers; .
 Career Anchors: The Changing Nature of Careers Self Assessment, 4th Edition with John VanMaanen (2013) Wiley; .
 Organizational Psychology Then and Now: Some Observations. Annual Review of Organizational Psychology and Organizational Behavior, Vol. 2., pp. 1-19 (2015).
 Dialogic Organization Development: The Theory and Practice of Transformational Change edited by Gervase R. Bushe & Robert J. Marshak, foreword Edgar Schein (2015) Berrett-Koehler Publishers; .
 Becoming American: My First Learning Journey (2016) iUniverse; .
 Humble Consulting: How to Provide Real Help Faster (2016) Berrett-Koehler Publishers; .
 Organizational Culture and Leadership, 5th Edition with Peter A. Schein (2016) Wiley; .
 Humble Leadership: The Power of Relationships, Openness, and Trust with Peter A. Schein (2018) Berrett-Koehler Publishers; .
 The Corporate Culture Survival Guide, 3rd Edition with Peter A. Schein (2019) Wiley; .
 Humble Inquiry: The Gentle Art of Asking Instead of Telling, 2nd Edition with Peter A. Schein (2021) Berrett-Koehler Publishers; .

Awards, honors
Awards
 Lifetime Achievement Award in Workplace Learning and Performance of the American Society of Training and Development, February 3, 2000
 Everett Cherrington Hughes Award for Career Scholarship, Careers Division of the Academy of Management, August 8, 2000
 Marion Gislason Award for Leadership in Executive Development, Boston University School of Management Executive Development Roundtable, December 11, 2002
 Distinguished Scholar-Practitioner Award of the Academy of Management, 2009
 Life Time Achievement Award from the International Leadership Association, 2012
 Honorary Doctorate from the IEDC Bled School of Management in Slovenia, 2012

Professional
 Fellow, American Psychological Association
 Fellow, Academy of Management

Board member
 Advisory Board, Institute of Nuclear Power Operations
 Board Member, Massachusetts Audubon Society
 Board Member, Boston Lyric Opera

See also
Warren Bennis
Harold Leavitt
David Nadler
John Van Maanen
List of social psychologists

References

1928 births
2023 deaths
American business theorists
21st-century American psychologists
Mind control theorists
University of Chicago alumni
Harvard University alumni
Stanford University alumni
MIT Sloan School of Management faculty
Massachusetts Institute of Technology faculty
Swiss emigrants to the United States
20th-century American psychologists